Portia on Trial is a 1937 American film about a trial based on story of Faith Baldwin and directed by George Nicholls Jr. It was nominated to win the Oscar for Best Music in the 10th Academy Awards.

Premise
Lady lawyer Portia Merryman (Frieda Inescort) defends woebegone Elizabeth Manners (Heather Angel), who is on trial for shooting her lover Earle Condon (Neil Hamilton).

Cast

References

External links
 

1937 films
American black-and-white films
1937 drama films
Films directed by George Nicholls Jr.
Republic Pictures films
Films based on works by Faith Baldwin
American drama films
1930s American films